Sanguirana  everetti is a species of true frog. It is endemic to the island of Mindanao in the Philippines.

References

everetti
Endemic fauna of the Philippines
Fauna of Mindanao
Amphibians of the Philippines
Amphibians described in 1882